Gayathiri Iyer (also known as Urmila Gayathri) is an Indian actress and model from Kerala, who has acted predominantly in Hindi, Kannada, Telugu and Bengali films.

Films
Her first notable film in Kannada was Namo Bhootatma, a remake of the Tamil film Yaamirukka Bayamey, produced by Eldred Kumar of RS Infotainment and starred Komal and Harish Raj as the male leads. Namo Bhootatma ran for 100 days in Karnataka and was well received by the audience.

Iyer's next release was Ouija in Kannada by Vega Entertainment which was filmed in Malaysia and parts of Bangalore and Hyderabad. It starred Shraddha Das, Madhuri Itagi, Sayaji Shinde and Bharath.
She made her television debut in  Ekta Kapoor's serial Haiwaan : The Monster and was praised for portraying her natural evil look on camera.

Filmography

Television

References

Living people
Indian film actresses
21st-century Indian actresses
Actresses in Hindi cinema
Actresses from Kochi
Actresses in Telugu cinema
Actresses in Kannada cinema
Actresses in Bengali cinema
Actresses in Tamil cinema
1983 births